This is a list of erotic video games.

Legend

List of erotic games

See also
List of eroge

References

Video game lists by genre